Svein Aage Christoffersen (born 27 April 1947) is a Norwegian theologian.

Born in Oslo, he took his cand.theol. degree in 1973 and the dr.theol. degree in 1982, with a thesis on Gerhard Ebeling. He edited the journal Norsk Teologisk Tidsskrift from 1982 to 1993 and also became a professor of systematic theology at the University of Oslo in 1982. From 1984 to 1989 he served as dean of the Faculty of Theology. He is a member of the Norwegian Academy of Science and Letters.

References

1947 births
Living people
Norwegian theologians
Academic staff of the University of Oslo
Members of the Norwegian Academy of Science and Letters